The Dhammadūta Chekinda University is a Buddhist missionary university, located in Auk War Nat Chaung village, Hmawbi Township, Yangon Region. It was founded in 2017 by Dhammaduta abbot Dr. Ashin Chekinda and opened on February 24, 2019.

Departments 
 Department of Sutta 
 Department of Abhidhamma 
 Department of Kamma, Meditation
 Department of Buddhist Philosophy
 Department of Pali Literature
 Department of Buddhist History and Culture

Ovadacariya abbots 
Shwe Kyin Missionary Sayadaw (Vizzar Yone Sayadaw Gyi- Yangon)
Bhaddanta Indo Bhasa Bhiwantha (Maha Gandharya Temple - Amarapura)
Bhaddanta Nyanitsara (Sitagu Sayadaw - Sagaing)
Bhaddanta Agga Nyanabiwantha (Si Shin Sayadaw Gyi- Mandalay)
Bhaddanta Nandamala Bhiwantha (Archbishop- Sagaing)
Bhaddanta Kosala (Wizzalankara Sayadaw- Mandalay)
Bhaddanta Thirinda Bhiwantha (Tipitaka Yaw Sayadaw - Yangon)
Bhaddanta Idata Thiri Bhiwantha (Aweyrama Sayadaw Mandalay)
Dr. Bhaddanta Sandanathara (Kyaukme Sayadaw - Shan State)
Bhaddanta Vayaminda Bhiwantha (Tipitaka Yezakyo Sayadaw - Yangon)
Dr. Bhaddanta Adiswantha (International Theravada Buddhist Missionary University - Yangon)
Bhaddanta Nyanuttara (Dhammaduta School - InYe)
Bhaddantawa Settha Bhiwantha (Ma Soe Rim Temple - Mandalay)

References

External links 

Buddhist universities and colleges
Universities and colleges in Yangon Region
Educational institutions established in 2017
2017 establishments in Myanmar